The Jisha murder case was a rape and murder crime that shook the Indian state of Kerala during April 2016 and it went on to become the most publicized crime case during the Kerala Legislative elections in May 2016.

Victim background
Jisha, a 29-year-old law student at the Government Law College, Ernakulam, was found murdered on 28 April 2016 at her home near a canal in Perumbavoor in Ernakulam. She was found dead at her house on 28 April 8.30 pm by her mother Rajeswari. Jisha was a Hindu woman belonging to the scheduled caste. She was living with her mother, who works as a casual labourer. Her father, Pappu, who had separated from the family, lived alone and was found dead on 9 November 2017 due to natural causes. Police were puzzled in the initial stages of the investigation, due to the mother's paranoia and the family's lack of relationships with neighbors or relatives. This affected the case's progress initially, among other factors.

Murder
The police found the body mutilated and disturbingly sliced. Forensics concluded the body injuries showed violence, possible torture and presence of alcohol. The report also noted that the culprit had used a sharp weapon to disembowel her. Jisha was stabbed over 30 times. Her chest was pierced with a dagger. The postmortem conducted at Alappuzha Medical college states that, severe infliction on the neck led to her death.
According to forensic officials, samples of blood and saliva recovered have been sent for examination, and DNA is recorded for matching.  Upon preliminary investigation, the police revealed that Jisha would have been murdered when she resisted the rape attempt. The investigators also probed into migrant workers in the area for any clue on the murder.

Case impact
The crime took place in the backdrop of the Kerala Legislative elections, and hence gained momentum and focus from political parties. As a woman brutally murdered in her home in Perumbavoor, Justice for Jisha was the hashtag (#JusticeForJisha) used in the social media during April 2016 to quicken efforts for justice to Jisha by politicians and largely by people. The film industry also joined forces in demanding justice for Jisha. The government has declared to offer a financial consolation of Rs 10 lakh to the family of Jisha and a home will be provided for her parents. Also many artists and humanitarians pledged support to the case.

Arrest of murderer
Through continuous search of the police and involvement of people, the Jisha murder case came through a breakthrough. A man hailing from Assam informed his doubts about a worker he knew to the Kerala police; following the lead they picked up the Assamese labourer, and learnt that 24-year-old Ameer-ul-Islam was the culprit and was arrested from Kancheepuram in Tamil Nadu. He admitted committing the gruesome murder of the woman in Perumbavoor. Police found that the crime was motivated by previous grudge and revenge and committed under the influence of alcohol. The alcoholic assailant observed Jisha's routine and waited to sexually assault her; in that effort and rage he killed her and when she asked for water moments before death he gave her alcohol that he had with him. DNA tests conducted, matched and the police also recovered the knife used by the perpetrator. Police also suspect Anarul Islam's involvement, a friend of Ameerul Islam who fled after the murder news. He allegedly escaped from Assam before the arrest.

Sentencing and aftermath
Advocate Biju Antony Aloor (popularly known as Advocate B A Aloor) hailing from Aloor, Thrissur district in Kerala, appeared in the court as the defence lawyer for the accused Ameer ul Islam in the Jisha murder case. He has also appeared in the court as the defence lawyer for Govindachamy, the man who was accused of murdering a woman traveling in a train in 2011 in Thrissur.For premeditated murders, rape, and the use of disabling violent force, the verdict is usually life imprisonment or death sentence.

The case also has motivated the government to structure a policy to halt differentiating people overly as men and women, which creates stereotyped societal divide and asked media to regulate depictions of gender-negative stereotypes to cultivate gender equity, lessen the crimes as a long-term plan to a certain extent and to regulate yellow journalism in forms of discussions and unnecessary probings through media, primarily to minimize the impact of trauma. This case also made the government to actively saddle on the implementation of alcohol prohibition in a phased manner. The Ernakulam principal district and sessions court, in December 2017, awarded death penalty to Ameer ul-Islam, the sole accused in the case. He was also awarded life term, and rigorous imprisonment of 10 and 7 years.

References

Rape in India
Stalking
May 2016 crimes in Asia
Murder in India
2016 murders in Asia
2016 murders in India
Deaths by stabbing in India
Violence against women in India
Female murder victims